Brachylomia is a genus of moths of the family Noctuidae.

Species
 Brachylomia algens (Grote, 1878) (synonym Brachylomia onychina (Guenée, 1852))
 Brachylomia cascadia J.T.Troubridge & Lafontaine, 2007
 Brachylomia chretieni (Rothschild, 1914)
 Brachylomia curvifascia (Smith, 1891)
 Brachylomia discinigra (Walker, 1856)
 Brachylomia discolor Smith, 1904
 Brachylomia elda (French, 1887)
 Brachylomia incerta Köhler, 1952
 Brachylomia obscurifascia J.T.Troubridge & Lafontaine, 2007
 Brachylomia pallida J.T.Troubridge & Lafontaine, 2007
 Brachylomia populi (Strecker, 1898)
 Brachylomia pygmaea (Draudt, 1950)
 Brachylomia rectifascia (Smith, 1891)
 Brachylomia sierra J.T.Troubridge & Lafontaine, 2007
 Brachylomia thula (Strecker, 1898)
 Brachylomia uralensis (Warren, 1910)
 Brachylomia viminalis – minor shoulder-knot (Fabricius, 1777)

References
 Brachylomia at Markku Savela's Lepidoptera and Some Other Life Forms
 Natural History Museum Lepidoptera genus database
 Troubridge, J.T. & Lafontaine, J.D. (2007). "A revision of the North American species of Brachylomia (Lepidoptera: Noctuidae: Xyleninae) with description of four new species." The Canadian Entomologist 139: 209-227.